8th Arrondissement may refer to:
 8th arrondissement of Lyon
 8th arrondissement of Marseille
 8th arrondissement of Paris
 8th arrondissement of the Littoral Department, Benin

Arrondissement name disambiguation pages